The 2015–16 EBU Player of the Year Championship was the competition's second season. Points were accumulated over the EBU's ten most prestigious events from 1 October 2015 to 30 September 2016. Alexander Allfrey and Andrew Robson became the first pair to share the title.

List of Competitions

Summary of Results

This list displays the top ten players; 143 players received points. Winners of each event are highlighted in bold.

References

Contract bridge competitions
Contract bridge in the United Kingdom